Pizza Ranch, Inc., founded in 1981, is a Midwestern fast casual restaurant chain. Pizza Ranch offers pizza, chicken, a salad bar, and a pizza and chicken buffet. Pizza Ranch has over 200 locations in Iowa, Arkansas, Colorado, Illinois, Kansas, Michigan, Minnesota, Missouri, Montana, Nebraska, Tennessee, North Dakota, South Dakota, Wisconsin, and Wyoming. 

Pizza Ranch was founded by Adrie Groeneweg and Lawrence Vander Esch. Vander Esch however left the company in 2001 after being arrested and sent to prison for sexual abuse involving obtaining semen samples of his teen employees. The first restaurant opened December 21, 1981, in Hull, Iowa.  The second Pizza Ranch opened in Orange City, Iowa in 1983.

Pizza Ranch has grown over the years and now has franchises in thirteen states. Pizza Ranch's specialties are pizza and chicken. Their headquarters, formerly located in Hull, Iowa, have moved to Orange City, Iowa.

Pizza Ranch is a Christian-based company. The Pizza Ranch vision is "To glorify God by positively impacting the world we live in."

Because Iowa has the first caucus/primary for US presidential elections and Pizza Ranch has over 70 locations in Iowa, they are a frequent stop for presidential candidates, particularly Republicans such as Donald Trump, although Democrats such as Joe Biden and Hillary Clinton have also made appearances.

See also
 List of pizza chains of the United States

References

External links 
 

Economy of the Midwestern United States
Regional restaurant chains in the United States
Pizza chains of the United States
Restaurants established in 1981
Restaurants in Iowa
Buffet restaurants
Fast casual restaurants
Pizza franchises
Hull, Iowa
Orange City, Iowa
1981 establishments in Iowa
Theme restaurants
American companies established in 1981